Muricopsinae is a taxonomic subfamily of predatory sea snails, marine gastropod mollusks within the large family Muricidae, the murex snails and rock snails.

A study, released in September 2010, showed that the subfamily Muricopsinae is polyphyletic

Characteristics
This subfamily has been delineated based on the characteristics of the operculum and the radula.

The shell is wide in the middle and tapers at both ends, making it fusiform to biconic. The size of the shell varies in length between 5 mm and 85 mm. Its color is white or brown, covered with subdued shades of brown, orange, red or purple markings. The aperture is broadly oval to almost round and is of variable size. Contrary to the other Muricidae, the siphonal canal, the semi-tubular extension of the aperture, is of moderate length. Like the other murex shells, each convex whorl shows a variable number (four or more) of more or less prominent varices (a thickened axial ridge in the shell), which, in turn, show foliaceous or spinose projections.

The operculum is the same as in the subfamily Muricinae. It is unguiculate, thickened at the margin and depressed and annulate in the middle.

The rachiglossan radula has in each row a three-dimensional rachidian tooth with a raised central cusp and two lateral teeth, as in the subfamily Ocenebrinae.

Distribution
The genera in this subfamily are distributed worldwide, mainly in tropical and subtropical waters, at depths between 0 and 300 m.

Genera
 Acanthotrophon Hertlein & Strong, 1951
 Bizetiella Radwin & D'Attilio, 1972
 Eofavartia Merle, 2002
 Favartia Jousseaume, 1880
 Homalocantha Mörch, 1852
 Maxwellia Baily, 1950
 Murexsul Iredale, 1915
 Muricopsis Bucquoy & Dautzenberg, 1882
 Pazinotus E.H. Vokes, 1970
 Pradoxa Fernandes & Rolan, 1993
 Pygmaepterys E. H. Vokes, 1978
 Rolandiella B.A. Marshall & Burch, 2000
 Subpterynotus Olsson & Harbison, 1953
 Vitularia Swainson, 1840
 Xastilia Bouchet & Houart, 1994

Several genera that were recognized in the past have now become synonyms :
 Minnimurex Woolacott, 1957 accepted as Murexiella Clench & Farfante, 1945
 Murexiella Clench & Farfante, 1945 accepted as Favartia (Murexiella) Clench & Perez Farfante, 1945
 Paradoxa Fernandes & Rolan, 1990 accepted as Pradoxa Fernandes & Rolan, 1993
 Paradoxon Fernandes & Rolán, 1990 accepted as Pradoxa Fernandes & Rolan, 1993
 Risomurex Olsson & McGinty, 1958 accepted as Muricopsis (Risomurex) Olsson & McGinty, 1958
 Transtrafer Iredale, 1929 accepted as Vitularia Swainson, 1840

References

 
Muricidae